The Salat are Hindu caste found in the state of Gujarat in India.

History and origin

The word Salat has been derived from Salaya which means stone. They are a community of stone cutters. The community is concentrated in Banaskantha, Sabarkantha and Mehasana districts, and they speak Gujarati. A small number of Salaat were converted to Islam and now form a distinct community of Muslim Salaat.

Present circumstances

The two divisions are divided into a number of clans, the main ones being the Rathore, Parmar, Solanki and Bijpar, which are exogamous.  Their main occupation remains the selling and manufacture of grinding stones.

See also

Muslim Salaat
Sompura Salat

References

Social groups of Gujarat
Indian castes